Lambsar (also pronounced Lamsar), Lamasar, Lambasar, Lambesar or Lomasar was probably the largest and the most fortified of the Ismaili castles. The fortress is located in the central Alburz mountains, south of the Caspian Sea, about 120 km from present-day Tehran, Iran. Lambsar is to the northeast of Razmian village (the central district of Roodbar e Shahrestan).

Kiya Buzurg Ummid (died 1138) captured the castle from Rasamuj and rebuilt it into a major stronghold using local labour. He was appointed by Hassan-i Sabbah (died 1124) as its governor.

Only ruins remain of this magnificent fortress today. Very deep valleys  surrounding the fortress make it impossible to access from the East and West sides. The North and South fronts are the only possible ways to get into the fortress. Although the slope of the mountain with a difference of 150m on both levels is stretched from north to south with a length of 480m, the castle is more than 190m in width.  The huge two-layered parapets made up of very large 10m high stones, along with the main building in the north of the fortress with 1.2m wide cut stone walls, wonderful water reservoirs and grain stores in the south and southeast of the castle, towers and a water supply system are among the characteristics and features left within the Lambsar fortress which intrigue visitors. In the North side of the fortress a huge building with 4 smaller extensions remain which face to the East.

Final days

The Isma'ilis’ forts were the last line of defense against Mongol aggression in Persia. The Mongols had a hard time conquering the Isma'ili forts. Hulaku Khan was disappointed with his commanders therefore he took over an army of 10,000 soldiers and moved toward Alamut. In 1256 AD after a couple months the Meymoon-Dej (Meymoon-Diž) fort surrendered to Hulaku’s army, and Imam Rukn ad-Din Khurshah was captured. Hulaku Khan asked Khurshah to order his followers to surrender, but Lambsar fort, Gerdkuh fort and Alamut fort did not follow the order.  Finally after a year of resisting, a cholera epidemic took many lives in Lambsar and the fort fell in January 1257. Hulaku ordered the fort ruined and beheaded whoever had survived the deadly disease. In 1275 AD and again in 1389 AD, small groups of Isma'ilis who had survived the Mongol invasions attempted to recapture Alamut, but their attempts were short-lived.

Gallery

See also
Muhammad Tapar's anti-Nizari campaign
Ismaili
Iranian architecture
Alamut Castle
Atashgah Castle
Masyaf Castle

External links

 Pictures of Lambesar Fortress

References

Buildings and structures completed in the 4th century
Castles in Iran
Architecture in Iran
Buildings and structures in Qazvin Province
Alamut
Castles of the Nizari Ismaili state
4th-century fortifications
National works of Iran
Nizari Ismaili–Seljuk conflicts
Sasanian castles